For the military use of this facility, see Bakalar Air Force Base.
Columbus Municipal Airport  is three miles north of Columbus, in Bartholomew County, Indiana, United States.

Most U.S. airports use the same three-letter location identifier for the FAA and IATA, but this airport is BAK to the FAA and CLU to the IATA.

History 
The airport is on the site of the former World War II Atterbury Army Airfield, a U.S. Army Air Forces facility, and Bakalar Air Force Base, a Cold War-era U.S. Air Force installation utilized primarily by the Air Force Reserve.  It was the host base for the 434th Troop Carrier Wing twice, from 1949 to 1952 and again from 1953 to 1969.

Facilities

It has two concrete runways: 5/23 is 6,400 by 150 feet (1,951 x 46 m) and 14/32 is 5,000 by 100 feet (1,524 x 30 m).

In 2005 the airport had 39,155 aircraft operations, average 107 per day: 91% general aviation and 9% military. In 2015, 77 aircraft were based at the airport: 58 single-engine, 8 multi-engine, 7 jet, 2 helicopter, 1 glider and 1 ultra-light.

Terminal building 

The airport completely renovated its terminal building in 2015.

References

External links 

 Columbus Municipal Airport
 Aerial photo from Indiana Department of Transportation
 
 

Airports in Indiana
Transportation buildings and structures in Bartholomew County, Indiana
Columbus, Indiana